Thomas Søndergård (born 4 October 1969 in Holstebro, Denmark) is a Danish conductor and percussionist.

Biography

EUYO
Søndergård studied percussion at the Royal Danish Academy of Music from 1989 to 1992, where his teachers included Gert Mortensen. In the same years, he was a member of the European Union Youth Orchestra.

RDO
Søndergård joined the Royal Danish Orchestra as a percussionist in 1992. He served on the faculty of the Royal Danish Academy of Music from 2001 to 2002.

Søndergård devoted greater attention to conducting from age 27. After his debut at The Royal Danish Opera with the premiere of Poul Ruders's Kafka's Trial in 2005, he joined Askonas Holt management. In 2009, Søndergård became principal conductor of the Norwegian Radio Orchestra (KORK). He concluded his KORK tenure after the 2011-2012 season.

BBC NOW
Søndergård first conducted the BBC National Orchestra of Wales (BBC NOW) in December 2009, as an emergency substitute for Thierry Fischer. In July 2011, Søndergård was named the 14th principal conductor of the BBC NOW, effective with the 2012-2013 season, for an initial contract of four years. In February 2016, the BBC NOW announced the further extension of his contract as principal conductor through "at least 2018". Søndergård formally concluded his tenure as principal conductor of the BBC NOW in July 2018.

RSNO
Søndergård first guest-conducted the Royal Scottish National Orchestra (RSNO) in 2009, as an emergency substitute for Yakov Kreizberg. In October 2011, the RSNO named him its principal guest conductor, effective with the 2012-2013 season, with an initial contract of three years for three programmes per year. In May 2017, the RSNO announced Søndergård's appointment as its next principal conductor, effective with the 2018-2019 season. In February 2021, the RSNO announced the extension of Søndergård's contract as music director through autumn 2024.

In December 2021, Søndergård first guest-conducted the Minnesota Orchestra. He returned for another guest-conducting engagement in April 2022. In July 2022, the orchestra announced Søndergård's appointment as its music director, effective with the 2023-2024 season, with an initial contract of five seasons.

Sondergard has made several recordings for the Linn label and the DaCapo label, including music of Bent Lorentzen, Per Nørgård, and Poul Ruders.

In July 2022, Sondergard married his longtime partner, the Swedish baritone Andreas Landin.

References

External links
 Askonas Holt agency biography of Thomas Søndergård
 DaCapo Records English-language biography of Søndergård
 Dansk Kapelmesterforening (Danish Conductors Association) page on Thomas Søndergård 
 Laura Sinnerton, "Thomas Søndergård joins BBC NOW as principal conductor". BBC Wales Music blog, 12 July 2011
 Rhodri Lewis, "New conductor for BBC National Orchestra of Wales". BBC News Wales, 12 July 2011
 Caroline Rigby, "BBC National Orchestra of Wales plays for new conductor". BBC News Wales, 13 July 2011
 Meet the Music Director Designate: Thomas Søndergård

1969 births
Living people
Danish conductors (music)
Male conductors (music)
Royal Danish Academy of Music alumni
Danish percussionists
Timpanists
Academic staff of the Royal Danish Academy of Music
20th-century conductors (music)
21st-century conductors (music)
20th-century drummers
20th-century Danish male musicians
21st-century male musicians
People from Holstebro
LGBT classical musicians
20th-century Danish LGBT people
21st-century Danish LGBT people